The Greek Orthodox Archdiocese of Byblos and Batroun is an archdiocese part of the Syrian-based patriarchate of the Eastern Orthodox Church of Antioch.

List of Archbishops
 Paul Abou Adal (1901–1929)
 Elyia Karam (1935–1969)
 George Khodr (1970–present)

Byblos and Botrys (Mount Lebanon)
Eastern Orthodoxy in Lebanon
Greek Orthodox Church of Antioch
Byblos and Batroun